Katarina Kresal (born 28 January 1973) is a Slovenian politician. She was the Minister of the Interior in the government of Borut Pahor from 24 November 2008 till 19 August 2011.

Biography
Born in Ljubljana, Kresal studied law at the University of Ljubljana and in 1996 graduated with honours. Firstly, she was employed as a legal trainee at the Higher Court in Ljubljana, then as a law clerk in a Commercial Disputes department at District Court in Ljubljana. Later she worked as an independent advisor for legal affairs at Kapitalska družba d.d. and afterwards as a Director of the Legal Department in Western Wireless International, Slovenian company based in Ljubljana owned by Americans. Since 2003 she worked as an attorney in law firm Miro Senica & attorneys. In 2005 she became Deputy Head of Office and Head of Commercial and International Law Department.

She entered politics in 2007, when she was elected for the president of the Liberal Democracy of Slovenia (LDS). In the 2008 Slovenian parliamentary election, she was elected to the National Assembly. On 24 November of the same year, she became Minister of Interior of the centre-left government of Borut Pahor with a handover from Dragutin Mate.

On 12 January 2010, she was proclaimed the Slovenian Woman of the Year for 2009. The award is conferred each year by readers of Jana, the oldest Slovenian women's magazine.

On 10 August 2011, she stepped down as a Minister of Interior due to the opinion given by the Commission for the Prevention of Corruption of the Republic of Slovenia over a lease of a building to house the Slovenian National Bureau of Investigation. In their opinion they stated that there could be some irregularities in the lease of the building. She resigned due to her own principle values although she did not agree with the opinion given by Commission for the Prevention of Corruption. Her term ended on 19 August 2011, when the National Assembly took formal note of her resignation. She did not decide to retake the post of a deputy. She stated that she would use all legally possible channels to prove that the lease was untainted.

On 15 December 2011, Kresal irrevocably resigned as the president of LDS after the party failed to secure itself the entry into the National Assembly at the 2011 Slovenian parliamentary election.

In 2012 she founded European Centre of Dispute Resolution (ECDR). ECDR offers services in various fields, with emphasis on commercial, financial, business, consumer, civil, family and employment issues. ECDR operates internationally.

Controversies

Car chase 

On 14 March 2010, Katarina Kresal was a passenger in Audi A8 that was reported by Žurnal24 to be driving faster than  towards Fernetiči and without the police lights. The car stopped only after  of car chase. The policeman who drove the car was fined with 460 euros and 6 demerit points. On 2 April 2010, the police reported the speed did not surpass . Katarina Kresal said she had not been aware of the car speed.

References 

1973 births
Members of the National Assembly (Slovenia)
Liberal Democracy of Slovenia politicians
Living people
Interior ministers of Slovenia
University of Ljubljana alumni
Lawyers from Ljubljana
Politicians from Ljubljana
Women government ministers of Slovenia
Female interior ministers
20th-century Slovenian lawyers
21st-century Slovenian lawyers